The David Dance is a 2014 American drama film, written and produced by Don Scimé and directed by Aprill Winney. It premiered at the Cinequest Film & Creativity Festival on March 8, 2014. The film stars Don Scimé as David, the host of a gay radio show in Buffalo, New York, who struggles with self-doubt when his single sister Kate (Antoinette LaVecchia), asks him to be the father figure for her soon-to-be adopted Brazilian child. The cast also includes Guy Adkins (as Chris), Jordan Baker (as June) and Tonye Patano (as Mrs. P.).

The film was released theatrically on October 14, 2016  and on Amazon Prime Video in April 2018. It received the audience award for Best Feature Film at the Tallgrass Film Festival and the jury award for Best Feature Film at the Long Island International Film Expo among others. At its screening at the Miami Gay and Lesbian Film Festival, Scott Douglas in Edge Media Network wrote: "Once I reached the end I was overwhelmed with all different kinds of emotions and plenty of tears. Truly one of those movies that gets to the heart and soul of a person. If you have ever felt love of any kind, this movie is for you. 'The David Dance' is the surprise of the LGBT circuit." 
Kevin Thomas of Progressive Pulse called the film “A gem of a movie.” Emille Black in Cinema Crazed called the film "a personal and touching family drama. Well crafted with characters the viewers care about."
 In 2020 the film was listed as one of seven "queer hidden gems"  The screenplay is part of the permanent core collection of the Margaret Herrick Library (library of the Academy of Motion Picture Arts and Sciences).

The film is based on Scimé's play which premiered in New York City at the 2003 New York International Fringe Festival and in 2006 in Washington, DC.

Plot
David is the host of a local, late night radio show called "Gay Talk" in Buffalo, New York. When he is away from the microphone, he's shy and unsure of himself. But as "Danger Dave", his on-air alias, he's confidant and every listener's friend. He and his sister Kate, a thrice divorced banker with a yen for classical music and cats, are bonded by a secret, yet vast sense of inadequacy. Kate announces to David that she has decided to adopt an orphan in Brazil and asks him to be a father figure. David grapples with his self-doubts while also grappling on-air with a conservative radio host named June. Chris, an amiable coworker and a romantic interest from his past, challenges David to come to terms with his insecurities. David's past and present intertwine as he learns to love and accept himself.

Cast

 Don Scimé as David
 Guy Adkins as Chris
 Antoinette LaVecchia as Kate
 Jordan Baker as June
 Tonye Patano as Mrs. P. 
 JuJu Stulbach as Young Nun
 Lauren Lopes as Margaret

Accolades

References

External links 
 The David Dance on IMDB
 The David Dance on All Movie
 The David Dance Official Website

2014 films
American drama films
American independent films
2010s American films